"Pet Sounds" is an instrumental by American rock band the Beach Boys from their 1966 album Pet Sounds. Composed by Brian Wilson, it was originally called "Run James Run", as Wilson intended it to be used as the theme of a James Bond film. It was then titled "Pet Sounds", the title of the album on which it appears. It is the second instrumental to feature on Pet Sounds, the other being "Let's Go Away for Awhile".

Influences

The exotica piece has been compared to the work of Les Baxter and Martin Denny for its reverberated bongos and güiro combined with pervasive horns and a Latin rhythm. MOJO declared it an "ambiguous, jet-age update of Martin Denny-style 1950s exotica."  In his 2016 memoir, Wilson stated: "I loved Thunderball, which had come out the year before, and I loved listening to composers like Henry Mancini, who did these cool themes for shows like Peter Gunn, and Les Baxter, who did all these big productions that sounded sort of like Phil Spector productions." When asked if he was a fan of Denny and exotica music in a 2017 phone interview, he responded: "No, I never get the chance to listen to them. Never did."

Recording

It was performed by Brian and several session musicians, with no other members of the Beach Boys. The session sheet for the recording date carries the notation, "This is a working title only."

"Pet Sounds" was recorded on November 17, 1965 at United Western Recorders, with Chuck Britz engineering. The unique percussion sound heard on the track is drummer Ritchie Frost playing two empty Coca-Cola cans, at Brian's suggestion. Overdubs included bongos and two guitars filtered through a Leslie speaker.

The piece was written with the intention of using it in a James Bond film, and was originally titled "Run James Run". Wilson wrote and recorded an unrelated song with this same title for his 2015 album No Pier Pressure, but was not released until 2017 for the compilation Playback: The Brian Wilson Anthology.

Personnel

Per band archivist Craig Slowinski.

The Beach Boys
Brian Wilson – grand piano

Session musicians

Cover versions

1992 – Dos Dragsters, Smiles, Vibes & Harmony: A Tribute to Brian Wilson
2000 – Peter Thomas Sound Orchestra, Caroline Now!
2002 – Brooks Williams, Making God Smile
2003 – Tsuyoshi Kawakami, Moodmakers Mood
2005 – The Angry String Orchestra, String Quartet Tribute to Beach Boys' Pet Sounds
2006 – Architecture in Helsinki, Do It Again: A Tribute to Pet Sounds
2012 – Human Don't Be Angry, MOJO Presents Pet Sounds Revisited
2013 – The Duke of Norfolk, Mint 400 Records Presents The Beach Boys Pet Sounds

References

The Beach Boys songs
Exotica
1966 instrumentals
Songs written by Brian Wilson
Song recordings produced by Brian Wilson
Song recordings with Wall of Sound arrangements